Amaut is a village in Pindra Tehsil of Varanasi district in the Indian state of Uttar Pradesh. Amaut has its own gram panchayat by the same name as the village.

Demography
Amaut has a total population of 3,896 people amongst 584 families. Sex ratio of Amaut is 965 and child sex ratio is 875. Uttar Pradesh state average for both ratios is 912 and 902 respectively .

Transportation
Amaut can be accessed by road and does not have a railway station of its own. The closest railway station to this village is Babatpur railway station ( north-east). The nearest operational airports are Varanasi airport ( south-west) and Allahabad Airport ( west).

See also

Pindra Tehsil
Pindra (Assembly constituency)

Notes
  All demographic data is based on 2011 Census of India.

References 

Villages in Varanasi district